Albulatrematidae is a family of trematodes belonging to the order Azygiida.

Genera:
 Albulatrema

References

Platyhelminthes